There are at least 62 species of mammals known to occur in the Tijuca National Park in the city of Rio de Janeiro in Brazil.

Infraclass: Eutheria

Order: Chiroptera
 Family: Molossidae
 Genus: Cynomops
 Cinnamon dog-faced bat, Cynomops abrasus
 Genus: Molossus
 Velvety free-tailed bat, Molossus molossus
 Black mastiff bat, Molossus rufus
 Genus: Tadarida
 Brazilian free-tailed bat, Tadarida brasiliensis
 Genus: Nyctinomops
 Big free-tailed bat, Nyctinomops macrotis
 Genus: Eumops
 Black bonneted bat, Eumops auripendulus
 Family: Vespertilionidae
 Genus: Eptesicus
 Brazilian brown bat, Eptesicus brasiliensis
 Diminutive serotine, Eptesicus diminutus
 Argentine brown bat, Eptesicus furinalis 
 Genus: Histiotus
 Tropical big-eared brown bat, Histiotus velatus
 Genus: Lasiurus
 Southern yellow bat, Lasiurus ega
 Hoary bat, Lasiurus cinereus
 Genus: Myotis
 Silver-tipped myotis, Myotis albescens
 Black myotis, Myotis nigricans
 Red myotis, Myotis ruber
 Family: Phyllostomidae
 Genus: Lonchophylla
 Godman's nectar bat, Lonchophylla mordax
 Genus: Micronycteris
 Little big-eared bat, Micronycteris megalotis
 White-bellied big-eared bat, Micronycteris minuta
 Genus: Mimon
 Golden bat, Mimon bennettii
 Genus: Phylloderma
 Pale-faced bat, Phylloderma stenops
 Genus: Phyllostomus
 Pale spear-nosed bat, Phyllostomus discolor
 Greater spear-nosed bat, Phyllostomus hastatus
 Genus: Tonatia
 Greater round-eared bat, Tonatia bidens
 Genus: Lophostoma
 White-throated round-eared bat, Lophostoma silvicola
 Genus: Anoura
 Tailed tailless bat, Anoura caudifer
 Geoffroy's tailless bat, Anoura geoffroyi
 Genus: Glossophaga
 Pallas's long-tongued bat, Glossophaga soricina
 Genus: Carollia
 Seba's short-tailed bat, Carollia perspicillata
 Genus: Artibeus
 Fringed fruit-eating bat, Artibeus fimbriatus
 Great fruit-eating bat, Artibeus lituratus
 Dark fruit-eating bat, Artibeus obscurus
 Genus: Dermanura
 Gervais's fruit-eating bat, Dermanura cinerea
 Genus: Chiroderma
 Brazilian big-eyed bat, Chiroderma doriae
 Hairy big-eyed bat, Chiroderma villosum
 Genus: Platyrrhinus
 White-lined broad-nosed bat, Platyrrhinus lineatus
 Genus: Vampyressa
 Southern little yellow-eared bat, Vampyressa pusilla
 Genus: Desmodus
 Common vampire bat, Desmodus rotundus
 Genus: Diaemus
 White-winged vampire bat, Diaemus youngii
 Genus: Diphylla
 Hairy-legged vampire bat, Diphylla ecaudata 
 Genus: Pygoderma
 Ipanema bat, Pygoderma bilabiatum
 Genus: Sturnira
 Little yellow-shouldered bat, Sturnira lilium
 Family: Noctilionidae
 Greater bulldog bat, Noctilio leporinus

Order: Primates
 Family: Callitrichidae
 Genus: Callithrix
 Common marmoset, Callithrix jacchus (introduced)
 Family: Cebidae
 Genus: Saimiri
 Common squirrel monkey, Saimiri sciureus (introduced)
 Genus: Sapajus
 Black capuchin, Sapajus nigritus

Order: Rodentia
 Family: Sciuridae
 Genus: Sciurus
 Ingram's squirrel, Sciurus ingrami
 Family: Muridae
 Genus: Rattus
 Black rat, Rattus rattus (introduced)
 Family: Cricetidae
 Genus: Oxymycterus
 Atlantic Forest hocicudo, Oxymycterus dasytrichus
 Family: Cuniculidae
 Genus: Cuniculus
 Lowland paca, Cuniculus paca
 Family: Dasyproctidae
 Genus: Dasyprocta
 Azara's agouti, Dasyprocta azarae
 Family: Erethizontidae
 Genus: Coendou
 Paraguaian hairy dwarf porcupine, Coendou villosus
 Family: Echimyidae
 Genus: Trinomys
 Soft-spined Atlantic spiny rat, Trinomys dimidiatus

Order: Lagomorpha
 Family: Leporidae
 Genus: Sylvilagus
 Brazilian cottontail, Sylvilagus brasiliensis

Order: Pilosa
 Family: Myrmecophagidae
 Genus: Tamandua
 Southern tamandua, Tamandua tetradactyla
 Family: Bradypodidae
 Genus: Bradypus
 Brown-throated sloth, Bradypus variegatus

Order: Cingulata
 Genus: Dasypus
 Nine-banded armadillo, Dasypus novemcinctus

Order: Carnivora
 Family: Canidae
 Genus: Cerdocyon
 Crab-eating fox, Cerdocyon thous
 Family: Procyonidae
 Genus: Nasua
 South American coati, Nasua nasua
 Genus: Procyon
 Crab-eating raccoon, Procyon cancrivorus
 Family: Felidae
 Genus: Leopardus
 Margay, Leopardus wiedii (unconfirmed)

Infraclass: Metatheria

Order: Didelphimorphia
 Family: Didelphidae
 Genus: Caluromys
 Bare-tailed woolly opossum, Caluromys philander
 Genus: Chironectes
 Water opossum, Chironectes minimus
 Genus: Didelphis
 Big-eared opossum, Didelphis aurita
 Genus: Metachirus
 Brown four-eyed opossum, Metachirus nudicaudatus
 Genus: Marmosa
 Woolly mouse opossum, Marmosa demerarae
 Genus: Monodelphis
 Northern three-striped opossum, Monodelphis americana
 Southern three-striped opossum, Monodelphis theresa
 Genus: Philander
 Southeastern four-eyed opossum, Philander frenatus

References

Tijuca National Park